Curses! is a 1925 American silent comedy film directed by Roscoe Arbuckle and Grover Jones.

Cast
 Al St. John as Buttonshoe Bill
 Bartine Burkett as Nell

See also
 List of American films of 1925
 Fatty Arbuckle filmography

References

External links

1925 films
Films directed by Roscoe Arbuckle
Films directed by Grover Jones
1925 comedy films
American silent short films
American black-and-white films
1925 short films
Silent American comedy films
American comedy short films
1920s American films
1920s English-language films